Jeffersontown Fire Protection District (also known as the Jeffersontown Fire Department and/or Jeffersontown Fire and EMS) is a career fire department located in Jefferson County, Kentucky that protects the population of Jeffersontown, Kentucky, a home-rule class city within Louisville, and surrounding areas.

It currently operates four fully staffed fire companies and three ALS ambulances out of three active stations.

Station 1

St.1 is located at 10540 Watterson Trail and additionally serves as fire headquarters. It houses Quint Co. 3351, Battalion Chief 3303, Boat 33, Forestry 3375 and Medic 3381.

Station 2

St.2 is located at 4318 Taylorsville Rd and additionally serves as one of the county's HAZMAT response companies. It houses Engine Co. 3332, Hazmat 33, Foam 33, Medic Supervisor 3314, and Medic 3382.

Station 3

St.3 is located at 8630 Biggin Hill Lane. It houses Engine Co. 3333, Truck Co. 3363, and Medic 3383.

Station 4

Station 4 is located on Taylorsville Rd near the Tyler Center area. It is currently an empty lot purchased by the department to be used as the future home of Jeffersontown Fire and EMS St.4.

References

Infrastructure in Louisville, Kentucky
Fire protection districts in the United States
Jeffersontown, Kentucky

Jeffersontown Fire Website